333 West Wacker Drive is a highrise office building in Chicago, Illinois, noted for its reflection of the curves of the Chicago River on its river-facing side.

Design features
On the side facing the Chicago River, the building features a curved green glass façade, while on the other side the building adheres to the usual rectangular street grid. The glass reflects both the sky and the river flowing next to it. The architecture firm Kohn Pedersen Fox Associates who designed 333 also designed the high-rise buildings 225 W Wacker to the east, and 191 N Wacker Drive to the south.

The building marks the division between North Wacker Drive and West Wacker Drive as the street makes a 90 degree turn.  Based on the Chicago grid system for street numbers, if the building had been given an address on North Wacker, the street number would have been an odd number between 200 and 300.

Major tenants 
 Nuveen Investments
 Aetna Insurance
 RedRidge Finance Group
 ExWorks Capital
 Capgemini

In popular culture
333 Wacker Drive was featured in the 1986 movie Ferris Bueller's Day Off as the building containing Ferris Bueller's father's offices, and was voted "Favorite Building" by the readers of The Chicago Tribune in 1995. In celebration of the 2018 Illinois Bicentennial, the 333 W. Wacker Drive building was selected as one of the Illinois 200 Great Places  by the American Institute of Architects Illinois component (AIA Illinois).

The building is used for exterior shots of Crows Security headquarters in Batwoman.

Gallery

References

External links
 333 Wacker Drive at Hines Interests Limited Partnership
 333 Wacker Drive at Chicago Architecture Info
Illinois Great Places - 333 W. Wacker
Society of Architectural Historians SAH ARCHIPEDIA entry on 333 W. Wacker Drive

Office buildings completed in 1983
Skyscraper office buildings in Chicago
Hines Interests Limited Partnership
Kohn Pedersen Fox buildings
1983 establishments in Illinois